California's 10th State Senate district is one of 40 California State Senate districts. It is currently represented by Democrat Aisha Wahab of Hayward.

District profile 
The district includes the southern coastal East Bay and parts of Silicon Valley. The district has the highest Asian population of any California state senate district.

Alameda County – 40.7%
 Ashland
 Castro Valley
 Cherryland
 Fairview
 Fremont
 Hayward
 Newark
 San Leandro – 8.9%
 San Lorenzo
 Union City

Santa Clara County – 17.4%
 Milpitas
 San Jose – 13.2%
 Santa Clara

Election results from statewide races

List of senators 
Due to redistricting, the 10th district has been moved around different parts of the state. The current iteration resulted from the 2011 redistricting by the California Citizens Redistricting Commission.

Election results 1994 - present

2022

2018

2014

2010

2006

2002

1998

1994

See also 
 California State Senate
 California State Senate districts
 Districts in California

References

External links 
 District map from the California Citizens Redistricting Commission

10
Government of Alameda County, California
Government of Santa Clara County, California
Government in the San Francisco Bay Area